Sean Christopher Walsh (born 2 December 1985), known professionally as Seann Walsh, is an English stand-up comedian.

Early life
Walsh was born in Camden in London, but was brought up in Brighton. He left school with one GCSE examination pass, in Drama.

Career
Walsh is a graduate of Jill Edwards' comedy workshops and performed his first gig in November 2006. He won several awards early in his career including Leicester Mercury Comedian of the Year (2009) and Chortle Best Newcomer (2009). Walsh supported Stephen K. Amos on his 2008/09 Find the Funny and 2009/10 The Feelgood Factor tours, as well as at the 2010 Reading and Leeds Festival.

Walsh was resident host at Komedia's Comic Boom in Brighton and has also been an 'audience wrangler' (a more recent version of the traditional warm-up comedian) for QI.

Walsh performed his 2012 show Seann to Be Wild at the Edinburgh Festival Fringe and toured the country with it. He has performed shows with fellow comedian Josh Widdicombe named "Ying and Young". His 2013 Edinburgh Fringe show The Lie-In King received good press.

Walsh's stand-up style has been described as "impressively universal, gag-heavy, observational".

Walsh also presents a weekly show on FUBAR Radio with his friend, Mark Simmons.

From 8 September 2018, Walsh participated in the sixteenth series of Strictly Come Dancing with professional dance partner Katya Jones. Early in the series, it was reported that he had become romantically involved with Jones despite both of them being in long-term relationships, and his popularity suffered as a result. Walsh and Jones did an interview with Zoe Ball following the controversy, where after a televised grilling from Ball, Walsh apologised. The couple was voted out in Week 6.

Seann hosted Flinch, a physical gameshow for Netflix, alongside Lloyd Griffith, and Desiree Burch. The show is produced by Stellify Media.

In 2022, Walsh participated in Series 22 of I'm a Celebrity... Get Me Out of Here! on ITV1, and finished in 5th place on 25 November 2022.

Personal life 
Walsh's relationship with actress Rebecca Humphries ended in October 2018 after a video and photos of him kissing his Strictly Come Dancing partner Katya Jones were published. It was later reported that Katya and her husband Neil Jones had separated as an indirect result of the incident. In a now-viral tweet, Humphries stated that Walsh had called her “mental” and “psycho” for voicing her suspicions about his relationship with Jones in the weeks leading up to the incident. In her 2022 memoir Why Did You Stay? Humphries alleged that Walsh had reacted similarly when confronted about other instances of inappropriate behaviour throughout their five-year relationship. Humphries described Walsh as an emotionally abusive, controlling, and aggressive partner, and stated that several women had come forward following the Strictly scandal to reveal Walsh’s numerous past affairs.  Walsh subsequently incorporated his experiences on Strictly into his standup act. During an interview for i-News, in March 2022, Walsh described how the incident was still "trauma" for him and how he underwent treatment for depression and anxiety, to help him cope with the fallout.

Walsh has been in a relationship with dance teacher Grace Adderley since 2019. They live in a Victorian terraced house in Shepherd's Bush, London and are expecting their first child in February 2023. He is a Queens Park Rangers fan.

Appearances

Television
{| class="wikitable sortable"
|-
! Year
! Title
! Role
! Notes
|-
| 2009–2013 || Mock the Week || Panelist || 5 appearances
|-
| 2010 || Michael McIntyre's Comedy Roadshow || Himself || Episode 5- Bristol
|-
| 2011–2014 || Never Mind the Buzzcocks || Panelist || 4 appearances
|-
| 2011, 2013, 2016 || Live at the Apollo || Himself || 3 appearances
|-
| 2013 || Seann Walsh World || Presenter || 6 episodes
|-
| 2013 || Big Bad World || Eggman || Sitcom for Comedy Central
|-
| 2015, 2016 || 8 Out of 10 Cats || Panelist || 3 appearances
|-
| 2014–2017 || Virtually Famous || Team Captain || 4 series for E4
|-
| 2015 || 8 Out of 10 Cats Does Countdown || Panelist || 2 appearances
|-
| 2015 || Play To The Whistle || Panelist || 7 episodes
|-
| 2017–2018 || Bad Move || Grizzo || Sitcom for ITV 2
|-
| 2018 || Strictly Come Dancing || Contestant || Series 16
|-
| 2019 || The Jonathan Ross Show || Himself ||
|-
| 2019 || Flinch || Himself || 6 episodes for Netflix
|-
|2022
|The Lovebox in Your Living Room
|Various
|
|-
| 2022 || I'm a Celebrity...Get Me Out of Here! || 5th Place || Series 22
|-

|}

Film

RadioLoose Ends v BBC Radio 4 (March 2009)The Jon Richardson Show – BBC 6 Music (November 2009)Nick Grimshaw's Radio Show – BBC Radio 1 (June 2010)Matt Forde's Show – Talksport Radio (May & June 2010)Act Your Age – BBC Radio 4 (April 2011)

Tours

Online releases

Awards
Winner: Leicester Mercury Comedian of the Year 2009
Winner: Chortle Awards Best Newcomer 2009
Second place: Hackney Empire New Act of the Year 2009
Runner-up: Amused Moose Laugh Off 2008
Runner-up: So You Think You're Funny'' 2008

See also
 List of I'm a Celebrity...Get Me Out of Here! (British TV series) contestants
 List of Strictly Come Dancing contestants

References

External links
 
 
 

1985 births
English male comedians
English stand-up comedians
Living people
People from Lewisham
21st-century English comedians
People from the London Borough of Camden
Comedians from London
People from Brighton
I'm a Celebrity...Get Me Out of Here! (British TV series) participants